Mohammad Alinur Rashimy bin Awang Haji Jufri (born 12 June 2000) is a Bruneian footballer who plays as a full-back or midfielder for Kasuka FC of the Brunei Super League and the Brunei national football team.

Club career
In 2017, Alinur was a participant of the Tabuan Muda scheme organised by the National Football Association of Brunei Darussalam, which played league football in the 2017–18 Brunei Super League as Tabuan Muda 'A'. In the next season, he signed for Kasuka FC along with Hanif Aiman Adanan, Hanif Farhan Azman and Adi Syukri Salleh. He scored four goals in that season, helping Kasuka finish second in the league table.

On 7 August 2022, Alinur opened the scoring in a 13–0 drubbing of Lun Bawang FC in the first fixture of the 2022 Brunei FA Cup for Kasuka. They eventually went all the way to the final of the competition where they were beaten by DPMM FC by two goals to one.

In what was the opening match for the 2023 Brunei Super League, Alinur scored a late brace against MS PPDB on 3 March with the final score being 4–0.

International career

Alinur's first tournament with the Young Wasps was the 2017 AFF U-18 Youth Championship in September 2017 held in Myanmar where he only made a solitary appearance in a 1–8 drubbing against Vietnam. A year later, he suited up for Indonesia to take part in the 2018 AFF U-19 Youth Championship in July. Alinur played in two out of four games, both of them substitute appearances in defeats against Timor-Leste and Malaysia.

In 2022, Alinur was selected for the Brunei Under-23s squad for the February 2022 AFF U-23 Youth Championship matches held in Cambodia. Facing the home team in the first fixture, Alinur held the left side of the midfield but the Young Wasps succumbed to a 6–0 defeat. Three days later in the match against Timor-Leste, Brunei made a promising start with a goal by Hakeme Yazid Said but two deflections and an own goal condemned the boys in yellow to a 1–3 loss. Alinur kept his place in the final match against the Philippines but once again Brunei fell to a 2–1 defeat.

Alinur's performances in the Under-23s were noticed by then head coach of the full national team Rosanan Samak, who named Alinur in his first squad for the friendly match away against Laos at the end of the following month. He made his international debut and played 90 minutes in a 3–2 defeat in said friendly, played on 27 March. Two months later, Alinur was kept in the national team for the friendly match against Malaysia at Bukit Jalil Stadium in Kuala Lumpur at the end of May. He was a first-half substitute for Abdul Hariz Herman in the match which ended 4–0 to the hosts.

In early November 2022, Alinur played both games for the national team at the 2022 AFF Mitsubishi Electric Cup qualifying against Timor-Leste in Bandar Seri Begawan. Featuring at right-back, he helped Brunei qualify for the tournament proper with a 6–3 aggregate win for the Wasps. Alinur played two games out of four at the tournament when against Indonesia on 26 December in a 0–7 loss he was dismissed in the first half for two bookable offences, prematurely ending his involvement.

Personal life 
Alinur Rashimy has a younger brother, Azinur Rashiman who is also a Brunei youth international.

References

External links

2000 births
Living people
Bruneian footballers
Brunei international footballers
Association football fullbacks
Association football midfielders